José Maria de Jesús (born 13 April 1968) is an Angolan judoka. He competed in the men's lightweight event at the 1992 Summer Olympics.

References

External links
 

1968 births
Living people
Angolan male judoka
Olympic judoka of Angola
Judoka at the 1992 Summer Olympics
Place of birth missing (living people)